Pittsburgh Technical College (PTC) is a private college in Pittsburgh, Pennsylvania.  The college, formerly Pittsburgh Technical Institute, opened in 1946 and has since expanded with more than 30 career-focused programs in ten schools. Bachelor's and associate degrees are awarded, in addition to certificate programs.

Previously an employee-owned for-profit school, PTC became nonprofit in 2017 when it was purchased by the Center for Educational Excellence, Inc.

Campus 
There are five buildings on campus, including a six-story, main facility where students attend most of their classes. The Trades and Technology Center houses the School of Trades Technology and Energy and Electronics Technology programs. The main building features classrooms on all floors, labs,  the PTC Café on the fourth level, a large gallery and meeting place on the fifth floor, professional kitchens on the sixth floor for culinary students, lounge areas, and a library.

Housing 
Approximately 51% of the student population live in school-sponsored, apartment-style housing on the campus.

Accreditation  
Pittsburgh Technical College is accredited by Middle States Commission on Higher Education. It is also authorized by the Pennsylvania Department of Education to award Academic Associate in Science degrees and Bachelor of Science degrees.

Programs at Pittsburgh Technical College have earned and maintain the following specialized accreditations and recognitions from accrediting bodies:

 Surgical Technology and Medical Assisting programs are accredited by the Commission on Accreditation of Allied Health Education Programs (CAAHEP).
 Practical Nursing program is accredited by the Accreditation Commission for Education in Nursing.
 Practical Nursing and Associate in Science Nursing programs are approved by the Pennsylvania State Board of Nursing.
 Associate in Science degree and Certificate program in Culinary Arts are accredited by the American Culinary Federation (ACF).
In December 2022, the ARM Institute announced a partnership between Carnegie Mellon Robotics and Pittsburgh Technical College. The partnership opened new paths to PTC's Robotics & Autonomous Engineering Technology (RAET) associate degree program.

References

External links

Universities and colleges in Pittsburgh
Educational institutions established in 1946
1946 establishments in Pennsylvania
For-profit universities and colleges in the United States